Voids is the sixth and final full-length album from Minus the Bear, released on March 3, 2017. It is their fourth full-length album to be released on Suicide Squeeze Records (and their first on the label since 2007's Planet of Ice) and was produced by Sam Bell. It is their only album recorded with drummer Kiefer Matthias, who had joined the band in 2015 to replace Erin Tate.

Track listing

Personnel

Minus the Bear
 Jake Snider - Lead vocals, Guitar
 Dave Knudson - Guitar, Bass
 Kiefer Matthias - Drums, Percussion
 Cory Murchy - Bass
 Alex Rose - Keyboards, Vocals

Additional personnel
 Produced by Sam Bell
 Mastered by Greg Calbi

References

Minus the Bear albums
2017 albums
Suicide Squeeze Records albums